Vem é dé du vill ha ("Who is it you want") is a pop song in Swedish, written by Thomas G:son and Calle Kindbom. With the song, Kikki, Bettan & Lotta competed in the Swedish Melodifestivalen 2002, where the song finished 3rd. The song is an old style and joyful "schlager" and is about love.

In 2002, "Vem é dé du vill ha" was also released on a single record, peaking at #32 at the Swedish singles chart. Between 23 March and 11 May 2002 the song was also listed in the Swedish radio show "Svensktoppen", peaking at #2 there.

The song was released to the Kikki, Bettan & Lotta album "20 år med oss - Vem é dé du vill ha".

Track listing
Vem é dé du vill ha
Vem é dé du vill ha (instrumental)

Charts

Svensktoppen

Sverigetopplistan

References

Melodifestivalen songs of 2002
2002 singles
Songs written by Thomas G:son
Swedish-language songs
Kikki, Bettan & Lotta songs
Songs written by Calle Kindbom
2002 songs
Mariann Grammofon singles